Nation Towers is the name of two skyscrapers near the southern end of the Corniche in Abu Dhabi, the capital of the United Arab Emirates.

Construction history
The construction of the towers was sponsored by International Capital Trading (owner), The contractors was a joint venture between Arabtec Construction and National Projects and Construction (NPC). The initial bid for the construction project was priced at $435 million (Dh1.6 billion). KEO International Consultants was the Lead Consultant, Engineer and Construction Supervisor. The design architect was  WZMH Architects, won the appointment through an international design competition.

Building description
The two buildings are located directly at the Abu Dhabi Corniche and have 65 and 52 floors. The Nation Towers were completed in 2013 and have apartments, offices, a shopping mall and a hotel (St. Regis Hotel Abu Dhabi). The complex offers approximately 278,709 meters of usable space. This include a 5-star hotel with 350 rooms, spas and a fitness facility. It is also home to upscale boutique shops geared towards high-end consumers.

Both buildings are connected with a skybridge at a height of 202.5 meters which connects floors 50 and 54. The skybridge was the highest in the world at its completion.

See also
 List of tallest buildings in Abu Dhabi
 List of tallest buildings in the United Arab Emirates

References

External links
 Nation Towers website
 Consructionweekonline.com
 Skyscrapernews.com
 Thenational.ae
 ProTenders.com

Office buildings completed in 2013
Residential buildings completed in 2013
Shopping malls established in 2013
Twin towers
Residential skyscrapers in Abu Dhabi
Skyscraper office buildings in Abu Dhabi
Skyscraper hotels in Abu Dhabi
2013 establishments in the United Arab Emirates